Willesden is an area of north west London.

Willesden may also refer to:

, ship built in 1944 by Caledon Shipbuilding, Dundee as Empire Canning
, ship built in 1961 by Barclay, Curle & Co Ltd, Glasgow
Willesden railway station (1841–1866), a former station
Willesden Junction station, a Network Rail station in Harlesden
Willesden Traction Maintenance Depot, a locomotive maintenance depot
Bishop of Willesden of the Church of England
Municipal Borough of Willesden (1874–1965)
Willesden F.C. (dissolved 1981), a football club